Here is a list of principalities and regions written in the Latin language and English and other names on the right.  This is NOT a duplication of Roman provincial names.

cty. - county
dept. - department
dist. - district
isl. -island
kdom. - kingdom
pen - peninsula
pref. - prefecture
prin. - principality
prphy. - periphery
prov. - province
reg. - region
state - state

List of names

Latinized form of a Greek derived name

See also
 Polish historical regions

External links
Dr. J. G. Th. Grässe, Orbis Latinus: Lexikon lateinischer geographischer Namen des Mittelalters und der Neuzeit, online at the Bavarian State Library
Grässe, Orbis Latinus, online at Columbia University
Hofmann: Lexicon Universale
Vicipaedia (Latina) names of countries

Regions
Lists of country names